Taguatinga may refer to:
 Taguatinga, Federal District, administrative region in the Federal District, Brazil
 Taguatinga, Tocantins, municipality in the state of Tocantins, Brazil
 Taguatinga Esporte Clube, football club of the Federal District, Brazil